Leśnik , German Leschnig is a village in the administrative district of Gmina Głogówek (Gemeinde Oberglogau), within Prudnik County, Opole Voivodeship, in south-western Poland, close to the Czech border.

Since 2009, the village, like much of the area, has been officially bilingual in German and Polish.

History
The first mention of the town dates back to 1217, when its name was Lesnie. The town is next mentioned in 1388, when Prince Wladislaw of Oppeln founded a Pauline monastery in the nearby village of Mochau. The area eventually came under the control of Austria, but was taken by the kingdom of Prussia in the 18th century. In 1850 the village was assigned to the parish of Mochau.
Until 1900 the village operated a distillery, and a watermill was functional until it was destroyed in a flood in 1903. In the village there are two chapels; one dedicated to Saint Urban I and another built to commemorate the plague of 1649. There are also four crosses in the village, erected in 1899, 1906, 1913, and 1954.

References

Villages in Prudnik County